Ghandouriyeh        is a Lebanese municipality located in the Bint Jbeil District, south of Froun. It was formerly known as Aidib.

Name
In the 1800s, the village was called Aidib, and E. H. Palmer wrote in 1881 that the name came from a local form connected with “much sand”.

History
In 1881, the PEF's Survey of Western Palestine (SWP)  described Aidib as: "A small village, built of stone and mud, situated on the slope of a hill and surrounded by a few fig-trees and olives. It contains about ninety Metawileh, and is supplied with water from three rock-cut cisterns and a spring."

During the 2006 Israeli offensive against Hizbollah Israeli Nahal commandos were airlifted into Ghanduriyah. A column of tanks attempting to reach them was ambushed in Wadi Salouqi. Eleven tanks were hit and seventeen Israeli soldiers killed, with fifty wounded.

References

Bibliography

External links 
 Ghandouriyeh, Localiban
Survey of Western Palestine, Map 2:   IAA, Wikimedia commons

Populated places in Bint Jbeil District
Shia Muslim communities in Lebanon